The Maronite Eparchy of Saint Maron of Montreal (in Latin: Eparchia Sancti Maronis Marianopolitana Maronitarum) is a Maronite Church ecclesiastical territory or eparchy of the Catholic Church in Canada. In 2014 there were 87,900 baptized. It is currently ruled by Eparch Paul Marwan Tabet.

Territory and statistics
Its episcopal see is located in Montréal, Quebec, where is located the  Saint-Maron Cathedral. Its jurisdiction embraces all Maronite Catholic faithful of the Maronite Church in Canada. It is directly subject to the Holy See in Rome, not part of any ecclesiastical province. In 2014 there were 87,900 baptized. Its current eparch is Paul Marwan Tabet, MLM.

The territory is divided into 17 parishes and in 2014 had 87,900 Lebanese Maronite Catholics.

History
It was established by the Pope John Paul II on August 27, 1982 on territory previously without Ordinary for the particular church sui iuris.
Most of the faithful Maronites of the eparchy arrived in Canada in major immigration periods, from present-day Lebanon, between 1860 and 1914, 1930 and 1960, 1970 to 1980 and 1989 to 1991. The Maronites brought a rich culture to their new homeland and retained their religious affiliation in a traditionally Christian society which had become largely agnostic.

In 1985 was founded in the eparchy of Montréal the first Canadian Maronite monastery, Saint Anthony the Great on Ducharme Avenue in Outremont in Quebec, belonged to the OLM. His former superior, Father Louis Hage was awarded by the Commemorative Medal for the 125th anniversary of Canada's Confederation on 13 April 1993.

Eparchs
 Elias Shaheen (Elias Chahine), first Bishop of Saint-Maron de Montréal of the Maronites (Canada) (27 August 1982 – 13 March 1985), then promoted ad personam Archbishop-Bishop of Saint-Maron de Montréal of the Maronites (Canada) (13 March 1985 – 23 November 1990)
 Georges Abi-Saber, O.L.M. (23 November 1990 – 7 February 1996), previously Eparch (Bishop) of Latakia of the Maronites (Syria) (4 August 1977 – 2 May 1986), Titular Bishop of Aradus (2 May 1986 – 23 November 1990), Patriarchal Vicar of Antioch of the Maronites (Lebanon) (2 May 1986 – 23 November 1990)
 Joseph Khoury (11 November 1996 – 10 January 2013), previously Titular Bishop of Chonochora (29 April 1993 – 11 November 1996)
 Paul Marwan Tabet, MLM (since 10 November 2013)

Extent 
There are 80,000 Lebanese Maronites in Montreal alone, distributed into seventeen parishes and missions.

The College of Antonin of the Lebanese Maronites is inside the Eparchy. He first built a monastery in the region in 1985 which is the Monastery of Saint Anthony the Great on Ducharme Avenue in Outremont.

Saint Maron is the patron saint of the eparchy. The Maronite Church of Saint-Georges du Mont Royal also attracts many Maronite worshipers in the region of Montreal.

Parishes 
''(by Canadian province) 
 Alberta
Our Lady of Peace, Calgary
Our Lady of Good Help, Edmonton
 Ontario
St. Charbel, Ottawa
St. Charbel, Oldcastle
St. Charbel, Mississauga
St. Elias, London
Our Lady of Lebanon, Toronto
St. Anthony the Great, Leamington
St. Peter's, Windsor
 New Brunswick
St. Charbel, Fredericton
 Nova Scotia
Our Lady of Lebanon, Halifax
 Quebec
St. Maron Cathedral, Montréal
St. Antoine le Grand, Montréal
St. Rafqa, Longueuil
St. Joseph, Laval
Our Lady of Lebanon, Québec City
 Prince Edward Island
Our Lady of Annunciation, Charlottetown

References

Sources and external links

 Maronite Catholic Eparchy of Saint Maron 
 Cathédrale Saint Maron - Montréal
 Missa

Lebanese-Canadian culture
Maronite Catholic eparchies
Eastern Catholic dioceses in Canada
Organizations based in Montreal
Christian organizations established in 1982
Religion in Quebec
Dioceses established in the 20th century
Middle Eastern-Canadian culture in Quebec
1982 establishments in Quebec